The 1961 Hardin–Simmons Cowboys football team was an American football team that represented Hardin–Simmons University in the Border Conference during the 1961 NCAA University Division football season. In its second and final season under head coach Howard McChesney, the team compiled a 0–10 record (0–4 against conference opponents), finished in last place in the conference, and was outscored by a total of 377 to 43.

No Hardin-Simmons players were named to the 1961 All-Border Conference football team.

Schedule

References

Hardin–Simmons
Hardin–Simmons Cowboys football seasons
Hardin–Simmons Cowboys football
College football winless seasons